In mathematics, an abelian integral, named after the Norwegian mathematician Niels Henrik Abel, is an integral in the complex plane of the form

 

Abelian integrals are natural generalizations of elliptic integrals, which arise when

where  is a polynomial of degree 3 or 4. Another special case of an abelian integral is a hyperelliptic integral, where , in the formula above, is a polynomial of degree greater than 4.

History 
The theory of abelian integrals originated with a paper by Abel published in 1841. This  paper was written during his stay in Paris in 1826 and presented to Augustin-Louis Cauchy in October of the same year. This theory, later fully developed by others, was one of the crowning achievements of nineteenth century mathematics and has had a major impact on the development of modern mathematics. In more abstract and geometric language, it is contained in the concept of abelian variety, or more precisely in the way an algebraic curve can be mapped into abelian varieties. Abelian integrals were later connected to the prominent mathematician David Hilbert's 16th Problem, and they continue to be considered one of the foremost challenges in contemporary mathematics.

Modern view 
In the theory of Riemann surfaces, an abelian integral is a function related to the indefinite integral of a differential of the first kind. We can regard

In the case of  a compact Riemann surface of genus 1, i.e. an elliptic curve, such functions are the elliptic integrals.

Such functions were first introduced to study hyperelliptic integrals, i.e., for the case where  is a hyperelliptic curve. This is a natural step in the theory of integration to the case of integrals involving algebraic functions , where  is a polynomial of degree . The first major insights of the theory were given by Abel; it was later formulated in terms of the Jacobian variety . Choice of  gives rise to a standard holomorphic function

of complex manifolds.

Notes

References 

Riemann surfaces
Algebraic curves
Abelian varieties